The Founder's Medal is a medal awarded annually by the Royal Geographical Society, upon approval of the Sovereign of the United Kingdom, to individuals for "the encouragement and promotion of geographical science and discovery".

Foundation

From its foundation, the society received an annual grant from the Sovereign of the United Kingdom for awards with royal approval. The medal originated from an annual donation starting in 1831 of 50 guineas from King William IV. The award was instituted as the Royal Premium or Royal Award, an annual cash prize. In 1836, the society with agreement from King William IV, decided to allocate half of the premium to a 'Gold Medal'. This would be awarded by the Sovereign, on the advice of the Council of the Royal Geographical Society. Queen Victoria succeeded to the throne before the first gold medal, which was designed in coordination with King William IV, was awarded. Queen Victoria announced her intention of continuing the grant commenced by her uncle. The council ultimately decided to divide the grant into two gold medals of equal standing; the Founder's Medal in memory of the founding patron King William IV and the Patron's Medal with the image of Queen Victoria as the active royal patron of the society.

Design

The medal, like the Patron's Medal, is a gold medallion designed by William Wyon, Chief Engraver of the Royal Mint. The obverse side has a portrait of William IV. The reverse side shows a figure of Britannia, wearing a helmet and standing by a sextant and globe. She is holding a wreath in her outstretched right hand and a map in the left. The name of the recipient is engraved on the edge of the medal. The medal was struck in gold until 1974. From 1975 onwards it has been struck in silver-gilt. Exceptionally, on account of wars, the medals of 1918−21 and 1940 were struck in bronze.

Award history

While generally awarded annually, the Founder's Medal was not awarded in the years 1850, 1851, 1855, 1913, 1943 and 1944. In 1850, the Patron's Medal was awarded but instead of awarding a Founder's Medal the council presented David Livingstone with a chronometer watch for 'his journey to the great lake of Ngami'. In 1851, the council awarded no gold medals and instead awarded 25 guinea prizes to each of Georg August Wallin and Thomas Brunner. In 1855, the Patron's Medal was awarded but instead of awarding a Founder's Medal the council presented Charles John Andersson with a set of surveying instruments (containing a sextant and stand, artificial horizon, watch, thermometers and measuring tapes). Awarding a prize funded by the annual royal grant that was not a medal recognized the valuable work of the recipient while concurrently indicating "the service had not been of sufficient importance to justify the award of a gold medal, the highest award at the disposal of the society." In 1913, the Patron's Medal was awarded but instead of awarding a Founder's Medal the council presented an engraved casket to Kathleen Scott containing the Patron's Medal and the Special Antarctic Medal awarded to her late husband Robert Falcon Scott. No awards were made in 1943 or 1944 on account of the Second World War.

List of recipients

References

External links

Boyd Alexander Founder's Medal
James Hector Founder's Medal

1831 establishments in the United Kingdom
Awards of Royal Geographical Society